John R. Killacky is an American politician and author. He was elected to the Vermont House of Representatives in 2019. Before his retirement in 2018, Killacky was the head of the Flynn Center for the Performing Arts in Burlington, Vermont.

Books
Queer Crips: Disabled Gay Men and Their Stories
because art: Commentary, Critique, & Conversation (Onion River Press, 2021)

References

External links
Official website

Living people
Year of birth missing (living people)
Democratic Party members of the Vermont House of Representatives
LGBT state legislators in Vermont